Franck Rabarivony (born 15 November 1970 in Tours) is a former professional footballer who played as a defender.

He debuted professionally for Auxerre's first team in 1993. During his illustrious 21-year career he also played for Real Oviedo, Vitória de Guimarães, Skoda Xanthi and Stade Tamponnaise.

Despite having never played in Madagascar, he has nonetheless represented the Malagasy national team in which he earned one cap playing his only game on 11 November 2003 against Benin in a 2004 African Cup of Nations qualifying match.

Honours
Ligue 1: 1995-96
Coupe de France: 1993–94, 1995–96
UEFA Intertoto Cup: 1997
Réunion Premier League: 2003–04, 2004–05, 2005–06, 2006-07
Coupe de la Réunion:  2007-08
Outremer Champions Cup:  2003–04, 2006–07
Océan Indien Cup:  2003–04, 2005–06, 2006–07

References

External links

1970 births
Living people
French sportspeople of Malagasy descent
People with acquired Malagasy citizenship
Sportspeople from Tours, France
Malagasy footballers
French footballers
France youth international footballers
Association football defenders
AJ Auxerre players
Real Oviedo players
Vitória S.C. players
Xanthi F.C. players
Ligue 1 players
La Liga players
Madagascar international footballers
French expatriate footballers
Malagasy expatriate footballers
French expatriate sportspeople in Portugal
French expatriate sportspeople in Spain
French expatriate sportspeople in Greece
Malagasy expatriate sportspeople in Portugal
Malagasy expatriate sportspeople in Spain
Malagasy expatriate sportspeople in Greece
Expatriate footballers in Portugal
Expatriate footballers in Spain
Expatriate footballers in Greece
Footballers from Centre-Val de Loire